Parker Dam is a concrete arch-gravity dam that crosses the Colorado River  downstream of Hoover Dam. The dam's primary functions are to create a reservoir, and to generate hydroelectric power. The reservoir behind the dam is called Lake Havasu and can store . The dam straddles the Arizona-California state border at the narrows the river passes through between the Whipple Mountains in San Bernardino County, California and the Buckskin Mountains in La Paz County, Arizona.

Power generation

The power plant has four Francis turbines with a combined capacity of 120 MW. Each turbine weighs . It produces electricity at 97 percent efficiency. Half of the electricity the plant produces is used by the Metropolitan Water District to pump water along the Colorado River Aqueduct, and the rest is sold to utilities in California, Arizona and Nevada.

Water supply

Lake Havasu is the water source for the Colorado River Aqueduct. The aqueduct is operated by the Metropolitan Water District of Southern California, which supplies water to almost all cities in the greater Los Angeles, San Bernardino, and San Diego areas. The district paid for nearly the entire cost of the dam, but it is owned and operated by the U.S. Bureau of Reclamation.

Lake Havasu is also the water source for the Central Arizona Project Aqueduct (CAP). The project is designed to provide water for irrigated agricultural areas, as well as municipal water for several Arizona communities, including the metropolitan areas of Phoenix and Tucson.

Controversy
Construction of the dam was a contentious issue for Arizona. Built as part of the larger Colorado River Compact of 1922, several political groups, their members and privately owned utility companies in  Arizona were not pleased with the plan in general and refused to sign it until 1944. Even then Arizona continued to dispute its water allotments until a 1963 Supreme Court decision settled the issue. The court has had to adjust the agreement several times since, most recently in 2000. As recently as 2008 Arizona Senator John McCain called for a renegotiation of the plan.

In 1935, when Arizona Governor Benjamin Baker Moeur sent 6 members of the Arizona National Guard to observe the dam's construction, they reported back that there was construction activity on the Arizona side of the river. Arizona Attorney General Arthur La Prade concluded that the Metropolitan Water District had no right to build on Arizona's territory, which prompted Governor Moeur to send a larger National Guard force to halt construction. The troops were recalled when Secretary of the Interior Harold L. Ickes halted construction until the issue had been settled.

The Department of the Interior took Arizona to court over the issue hoping to end the state's interference. To the Department of the Interior's surprise, the Supreme Court sided with Arizona and dismissed the injunction. The court concluded that the dam had never been directly approved by Congress and that California was not entitled to build on Arizona's land without Arizona's consent. Arizona eventually agreed to allow the dam in exchange for approval of the Gila River irrigation project.

Gallery

See also

 List of dams and reservoirs in California
 List of largest reservoirs of California
 List of power stations in California
 List of tallest dams in the United States
 List of United States Bureau of Reclamation dams

References

External links

USBR – Parker-Davis Project
USGS – Real-time water data for Colorado River below Parker Dam
Profile on desertusa.com

Dams in California
Dams in Arizona
Dams of the Lower Colorado River Valley
Hydroelectric power plants in California
Hydroelectric power plants in Arizona
Buildings and structures in La Paz County, Arizona
Landmarks in California
Landmarks in Arizona
Buildings and structures in San Bernardino County, California
Lake Havasu
United States Bureau of Reclamation dams
Historic American Engineering Record in Arizona
Historic American Engineering Record in California
Dams completed in 1938
Energy infrastructure completed in 1938
Arch-gravity dams
1938 establishments in Arizona
Dams on the Colorado River
1938 establishments in California